Love to Love may refer to:

Love to Love (film), a 2003 Dutch film
Love to Love (TV program), a 2000s Filipino show
"Love to Love", a song by The Monkees from Good Times!
"Love to Love", a song by UFO from Lights Out
"Love to Love", a song by Neil Diamond on the 1966 album The Feel of Neil Diamond